Tenaturris inepta is a species of sea snail, a marine gastropod mollusk in the family Mangeliidae.

Description

Distribution
T. inepta can be found in Atlantic waters, ranging from the eastern coast of Florida south to Brazil and surrounding Bermuda.; in the Caribbean Sea, the Gulf of Mexico and the Lesser Antilles.

References

 Rosenberg, G., F. Moretzsohn, and E. F. García. 2009. Gastropoda (Mollusca) of the Gulf of Mexico, pp. 579–699 in Felder, D.L. and D.K. Camp (eds.), Gulf of Mexico–Origins, Waters, and Biota. Biodiversity. Texas A&M Press, College Station, Texas
 Williams, Margaret. "Shallow-water Turridae of Florida and the Caribbean." M. Williams, Tallevast, Florida (2006).

External links
   Smith, E.A. (1882) Diagnoses of new species of Pleurotomidae in the British Museum. Annals and Magazine of Natural History, series 5, 10, 206–218  
 
 Gastropods.com: Tenaturris inepta

inepta
Gastropods described in 1882